Tablo is a digital video recorder (DVR) for Over-The-Air (OTA) broadcast television signals that is controlled by a tablet or web-based application. Using an HDTV antenna, Tablo collects free Over-The-Air HDTV signals; allowing the user to either watch live TV or record programs to an external USB hard drive or internal storage, depending on the model. Tablo can connect to a home network through either Wi-Fi or Ethernet connections.

Many consumers are choosing to discontinue cable or satellite due to escalating costs, a movement known as cord cutting. Cord cutters are beginning to supplement over-the-top content such as Hulu Plus and Netflix, with OTA programming. Tablo is one of many products that have come to market with this in mind.

Tablo is designed and developed by a company called Nuvyyo. Nuvyyo is an Kanata, Ontario based technology company, formed by veterans of the local technology scene, which launched in 2010.

Some of Tablo's competitors are: Simple TV, Channel Master, HDHomeRun and TiVo.

References

External links 

Digital video recorders
Electronics companies established in 2010
Digital media
Companies based in Ottawa